Juby Ninan is an Indian actor of Malayalam films. He made his debut with the Mukesh starrer Pershiakkaran.

Ninan was noticed as the leading Antagonist in the 2016 action film Dum starring Lal and Shine Tom Chacko.

Film career

Juby Ninan was among many newcomers selected for the film Pershiakkaran, a film that discussed the complexities of life in the fast paced world of Dubai. Ninan later appeared in Smart Boys and Aadu Thomaa. Film industry noticed him only after his antagonist role in Dum.

Juby Ninan later done Ore Mugham directed by Sajith Jaganathan co-starring Dhyan Sreenivasan and Parole with Mammootty.

Filmography

References

External links 
 

21st-century Indian male actors
Living people
Male actors in Malayalam cinema
Indian male film actors
Male actors from Kottayam
Year of birth missing (living people)